The following is a list of children of King Mongkut. He had 82 children, 39 sons and 43 daughters from 35 wives.

Ancestry

List of consorts

List of children

References

Thai monarchy
Mongkut
Mongkut
Mongkut